Paweł Marek Hreniak (born September 9, 1979 in Wrocław) is a Polish politician, voivode of the Lower Silesian Voivodeship since 2015,  member of the IX Sejm since 2019. He is a member of the Law and Justice political party. He represents the Nr. 3 (Wrocław) constituency.

Married, has a son and daughter.

References 

Living people
1979 births
Law and Justice politicians
Members of the Polish Sejm 2019–2023
University of Wrocław alumni
Politicians from Wrocław